C-72 was a blanket designation given to a variety of privately owned Waco enclosed-cabin biplanes pressed into service by the United States Army Air Forces in 1942. In all, 42 aircraft were taken and used for light transport duty wherever needed.

Variants

UC-72
12 impressed civil Waco SRE, powered by a  Pratt & Whitney R-985-33 Wasp Junior.
UC-72A
One impressed civil Waco ARE, powered by a  Jacobs R-915-1 (Jacobs L-6-1).
UC-72B
Four impressed civil Waco EGC-8, powered by a  Wright R-760-E2 Whirlwind.
UC-72C
Two impressed civil Waco HRE, powered by a  Lycoming R-680-9.
UC-72D
Two impressed civil Waco VKS-7, powered by a  Continental R-670-3 (Continental W-670-3).
UC-72E
Four impressed civil Waco ZGC-7, powered by a  Jacobs R-830-1 (Jacobs L-5-1).
UC-72F
One impressed civil Waco CUC-1, powered by a  Wright R-760E Whirlwind.
UC-72G
One impressed civil Waco AQC-6, powered by a  Jacobs R-915-1.
UC-72H
Five impressed civil Waco ZQC-6, powered by a  Jacobs R-830-1.
UC-72J
Three impressed civil Waco AVN-8, powered by a  Jacobs R-915-1.
UC-72K
Two impressed civil Waco YKS-7, powered by a  Jacobs R-755-1 (Jacobs L-4-1).
UC-72L
One impressed civil Waco ZVN-8, powered by a  Jacobs R-830-1.
UC-72M
Two impressed civil Waco ZKS-7, powered by a  Jacobs R-830-1. One later factory retrofitted with a  Lycoming R-680-13.
UC-72N
One impressed civil Waco YOC-1, powered by a  Jacobs R-830-1.
UC-72P
Two impressed civil Waco AGC-8, powered by a  Jacobs R-915-1.
UC-72Q
One impressed civil Waco ZQC-6, powered by a  Jacobs R-830-1.

References
Notes

Sources
 

Waco C-072
C-72